A letter bank is a relative of the anagram where all the letters of one word (the "bank") can be used as many times as desired (minimum of once each) to make a new word or phrase. For example, IMPS is a bank of MISSISSIPPI and SPROUT is a bank of SUPPORT OUR TROOPS.

The term was coined by Will Shortz at the 1980 convention of the National Puzzlers League. This puzzle type is the basis for the word game Alpha Blitz.

An imperfect anagram letter bank algorithm can be used to correct spelling mistakes, overcome transposition, dyslexic errors and double letter errors. Combined with other algorithms such as soundex, metaphone, and Levenshtein distance, it could make a very powerful "did you mean?" response to search engine queries.

Examples
 BRONTE is a letter bank of the classic Shakespeare quote "To be, or not to be".
 SENT, TENS, and NEST are each a letter bank of "Tennessee".

Word puzzles